Titus Flavius Piso was a Roman eques who held at least two senior postings during the reign of the Emperors Marcus Aurelius and Commodus. 

Few details of Piso's life before these two senior postings are known. One source preserves his full name Titus Flavius T.f. Pal(atina) Piso, which provides the praenomen of his father, Titus.

The first appointment Piso is known to have held is Praefectus annonae, the official responsible for the food supply of Rome. Two sources attest to this. The first is as one of the witnesses to the Tabula Banasitana, a bronze tablet dated to 6 July 177, which records the grant of Roman citizenship to a family in Mauretania Tingitana. The witnesses are drawn from the Imperial amici or senior courtiers, who include consular senators such as Marcus Gavius Squilla Gallicanus, Manius Acilius Glabrio Gnaeus Cornelius Severus, and Titus Sextius Lateranus; senior eques such as the former praetorian prefect Marcus Bassaeus Rufus, the current pretorian prefect Sextus Tigidius Perennis, prefect of the vigiles Quintus Cervidius Scaevola, and Publius Tarrutenius Paternus—as well as Flavius Piso. The second source attesting his appointment the inscription on a statue base from Ostia Antica dated 10 May 179.

The second posting Piso held was praefectus or governor of Roman Egypt. Titus Flavius Piso held this office around the year 181.

References 

2nd-century Romans
2nd-century Roman governors of Egypt
Ancient Roman equites
Roman governors of Egypt
Praefecti annonae
Piso